Naked Without You is the fourth studio album by American singer-songwriter Taylor Dayne, released on October 6, 1998. The album includes three singles; "Whatever You Want" (co-written by Dayne and originally recorded and released as a single by Tina Turner in 1996), "Unstoppable" and the title track "Naked Without You".

Track listing 
 "Don't Make Me Love You" (Andrew Roachford) – (4:10)
 "Whenever You Fall" (Taylor Dayne, Robert P. Graziose, Ernie Lake, Janice Robinson) – (4:49)
 "Unstoppable" (T. Dayne, Arnie Roman) – (4:07)
 "Naked Without You" (Rick Nowels, A. Roachford, Billy Steinberg) – (3:52)
 "Whatever You Want" (Andrew Baker, T. Dayne, Fred Zarr) – (4:50)
 "Stand" (Henry Hey, Stephanie Saraco) – (4:26)
 "You Don't Have to Say You Love Me" (Simon Napier-Bell, Giuseppe Donaggio, Vito Pallavicini, Vicki Wickham) – (4:09)
 "Love's Gonna Be On Your Side" (T. Dayne, Robbie Nevil) – (4:27)
 "Dreams" (T. Dayne, Tom Keane) – (4:00)
 "There Is No Heart That Won't Heal" (Diane Warren) – (5:17)
 "Soon As My Heart Breaks" (T. Dayne, Billy Mann) – (3:12)
 "Whatever You Want" (Remix) (A. Baker, T. Dayne, Fred Zarr) – (4:41)

Expanded Edition 
In 2005, Naked Without You was re-released with three extra tracks recorded from the live sessions in 1999/2000
 "Don't Make Me Love You" (A. Roachford) – (4:10)
 "Whenever You Fall" (T. Dayne, B.G. Grazoise, E. Lake, J. Robinson) – (4:49)
 "Unstoppable" (T. Dayne, A. Roman) – (4:07)
 "Naked Without You" (R. Nowels, A. Roachford, B. Steinberg) – (3:52)
 "Whatever You Want" (A. Baker, T. Dayne, F. Zarr) – (4:50)
 "Stand" (H. Hey, S. Saraco) – (4:26)
 "You Don't Have to Say You Love Me" (S. Napier-Bell, G. Donaggio, V. Pallavicini, V. Wickham) – (4:09)
 "Love's Gonna Be On Your Side" (T. Dayne, R. Nevil) – (4:27)
 "Dreams" (T. Dayne, T. Keane) – (4:00)
 "There Is No Heart That Won't Heal" (D. Warren) – (5:17)
 "Soon As My Heart Breaks" (T. Dayne, B.E. Mann) – (3:12)
 "Can't Get Enough of Your Love" (Live) (B. White) – (6:02)
 "How Can You Mend a Broken Heart" (Live) (B. Gibb, R. Gibb) – (5:14)
 "Love Will Lead You Back" (Live) (D. Warren) – (7:42)

Personnel

Musicians

 Taylor Dayne – lead vocals, background vocals
 Robert A. Arbitter – keyboards
 Jamie Muhoberac – keyboards
 Tom Keane – programming
 Carmen Rizzo – programming, percussion, drums
 Craig Else – guitar
 Louis Metoyer – guitar
 Tim Pierce – guitar
 Joel Shearer – guitar
 Tony Bruno – electric guitar
 Saul Zonana – acoustic guitar, bass
 Reggie Hamilton – bass
 Curt Bisquera – drums
 Ernie Lake – drums
 Joe Bell – string arrangements
 Yvonne Williams – background vocals
 Therese Willis – background vocals

Production 

 Taylor Dayne – arranger
 Tom Keane – arranger
 Eddie DeLena – engineer
 Adam Kagan – engineer
 Ray Pyle – engineer
 Mike Ross – engineer
 Carmen Rizzo – engineer, mixing
 Andrew Scheps – engineer, mixing
 Rob Chiarelli – mixing
 Jez Colin – mixing
 Pete Lorimer – mixing
 Dave Way – mixing
 C.J. DeVillar – assistant engineer
 Yoshi Sakashita – assistant engineer
 Lee Moore – wardrobe
 Omar Galeano – production assistant
 David Gardner – hair stylist
 Bert Stern – photography

Taylor Dayne albums
1998 albums
House music albums by American artists